Hiestand is a populated place situated in East Vincent Township in Chester County, Pennsylvania, United States. Hiestand is located at the intersection of Ellis Woods, Sheeder, and Ridge Roads.

References

Unincorporated communities in Chester County, Pennsylvania
Unincorporated communities in Pennsylvania